Isabella Camille Briones (born January 17, 1999) is an American actor and singer. A veteran of musical theatre, she rose to prominence for her starring roles in the CBS All Access (later Paramount+) series Star Trek: Picard (2020), including Soji, an android "daughter" of Data.

Isa Briones began her career as a model in New York City at age three, and started acting in feature films and stage productions in 2008. She won the Ovation Award for Featured Actress In a Musical for Next to Normal in 2018 in Los Angeles. Afterward, she returned to New York and became the youngest performer in the first touring company of Hamilton, playing multiple roles and earning praise for her "sultry alto" voice.

In addition to multiple acting performances in Star Trek: Picard, Briones sang a new arrangement of "Blue Skies" by Irving Berlin for the season one finale.

Early life 
Isa Briones was born in London, England, to Jon Jon Briones and Megan Briones ( Johnson), and she has a younger brother, Teo. Her family members are all musical theatre actors.  She is Filipino on her father's side, and Swedish and Irish on her mother's.

Her parents met in Stuttgart while auditioning for Miss Saigon; her father was closing its West End theatre production when Briones was born. She was ten months old when her family moved from London to New York City, where she began work as a model at age three. In 2006, when Briones was seven, her family moved to Los Angeles.

Briones learned acting and singing at home from her parents. She majored in theatre and musical theatre at the Los Angeles County High School for the Arts.

Career

Film and television 
Briones began her acting career as a child in 2008. She appeared in television commercials and played supporting roles in feature films including Brown Soup Thing, Takers and Lonely Boy.

For a television pilot in 2010, Briones played one of three children of a single mother moonlighting as a drug kingpin in Beverly Hills. In 2018, she appeared along with her father in an episode of The Assassination of Gianni Versace: American Crime Story.

In 2019, Briones was cast in Star Trek: Picard as two sets of synthetic twins: Dahj and Soji, and Jana and Sutra. Briones sent tapes of herself to audition for the web television series while she was playing multiple roles on stage in Hamilton, and learned during the process that she would portray twins in the series. She made her debut as both Dahj and Soji during the season premiere in January 2020. Sutra is introduced in episode nine.

Briones said she identified most closely with Soji who, after Romulan attacks, learns she is not human but rather an android created from a remnant of Data: "I think that's a very relatable story as a mixed person, deciding that you can be... both Filipino and white, and you can be both synthetic and human, if that's how you feel inside." Sutra presented a different direction for Briones, who chose a similar look to Data, and the novel challenge of acting opposite herself as Soji.

In his review of the series' debut episode, Entertainment Weeklys Darren Franich called its plot developments "shock tactics" and Dahj "vacant". Scott Collura of IGN wrote that Soji is effectively a plot device, but Briones "gives it her all week after week, reacting best she can to Soji's changing status quo". Keith DeCandido from Tor.com said her performance improved with each episode; "her confused post-activation Soji is her best work".

Paramount+ confirmed in April 2021 that Briones would return for the series' second season, in which she added a new character, Kore, genetically engineered "daughter" of 21st century geneticist Adam Soong (Brent Spiner). In the season finale "Farewell", Kore frees herself from Soong's influence and is recruited by Wesley Crusher (Wil Wheaton) to join the Travelers.

Briones confirmed on May 6, 2022, that Soji will not be returning for the series' third season.

In October, Briones was added to the cast of the Disney+ series Goosebumps, based on the novels by R. L. Stine. Briones plays Jane, a bookworm thought by her high-school classmates to be a snob.

Theatre 
Briones has performed in numerous stage musicals since childhood. She played Susan in a Los Angeles production of Miracle on 34th Street, in which Megan Briones appeared as her mother.

In 2018, Briones earned three Ovation Award nominations for Featured Actress In a Musical from the LA STAGE Alliance. She was nominated for her portrayal of Perón's mistress in Evita, and won for her performance in one of two discrete productions of Next to Normal. In his review of Next to Normal in August 2016, Cary Ginell of BroadwayWorld wrote, "Briones gives a disquietingly effective, achingly nuanced portrayal" of her character, Natalie; in October, Ginell called her song in Evita "one of the most quietly exquisite moments in the entire musical." Margaret Gray of the Los Angeles Times called Briones the "breakout star" of Next to Normal in May 2017: "Briones played the role before ... and she has a lock on it." Erin Conley of OnStage Los Angeles praised Briones's "beautiful, crystal clear voice."

Briones joined her father when he moved back to New York in January 2018. She was cast in Hamilton following a seven-month audition process, becoming at age 19 the youngest person to join the first national touring company. Over the course of its one-year run, she played both Peggy Schuyler and Maria Reynolds, and understudied for the role of Eliza Hamilton.  Her performances brought praise from Judith Newmark of the St. Louis Post-Dispatch: she "effectively plays Peggy Schuyler as a cupcake and Maria Reynolds as a flambé." Cincinnati CityBeats Rick Pender wrote, "Briones brings a sultry alto to her second role as Maria Reynolds," Hamilton's mistress. She toured with the company until March 2019, and was cast in Star Trek: Picard in April.

After production wrapped in Los Angeles on the series' first season, Briones returned to the stage. She appeared in AJ Rafael's Crazy Talented Asians, and #Hash(tag) America by Anthony Fedorov and Raye Zaragoza. In May 2020, Briones and the cast of Crazy Talented Asians began producing a monthly online performance series.

Briones returned to the stage in Los Angeles in April 2022 for a reading of Graves, a play written by Ellie Pyle and directed by Bola Ogun. In July, she joined the cast of Grease as staged by Musical Theatre West. Sean McMullen of The Press-Enterprise called her presence as Betty Rizzo "tough, seasoned, and visceral." Steven Stanley of Stage Scene LA wrote, "Briones gives Rizzo both power pipes and tough-girl swagger".

Music 
Briones has recorded several video duets with fellow Filipino-American performer AJ Rafael. Their version of "Rewrite the Stars" from The Greatest Showman was released as a single.

For the Star Trek: Picard season one finale, "Et In Arcadia Ego, Part 2", Irving Berlin's "Blue Skies" was set to play during Data's final scene as a bookend to his performance in Star Trek: Nemesis. Composer Jeff Russo wrote a new arrangement for the episode, and series co-creator Alex Kurtzman suggested they ask Briones to perform the vocals. Briones said, "it's so right that this is the song" playing at the end of Data's journey. Her rendition was released as a single in 2020.

Personal life 
As of 2020, Briones lives in Los Angeles.

In April 2020, Briones joined her Star Trek: Picard castmates including Jonathan Frakes, Jeri Ryan and Brent Spiner in a video message of hope to viewers affected by the COVID-19 pandemic. In July of that year, Briones took part in the Star Trek Universe Virtual Panel for Comic-Con@Home, the virtual event that replaced San Diego Comic-Con in 2020.

In 2021, she participated in a video campaign addressing hate crimes against Asian Americans.

Filmography

Discography

Awards

References

Footnotes

Bibliography

External links 

 
 

1999 births
21st-century American actresses
21st-century American women singers
21st-century American singers
21st-century English women
21st-century English people
Actresses from California
Actresses from London
American actresses of Filipino descent
American musical theatre actresses
American people of Filipino descent
American people of Irish descent
American people of Swedish descent
American singers of Asian descent
Living people
Los Angeles County High School for the Arts alumni